V-domain Ig suppressor of T cell activation (VISTA) is a type I transmembrane protein that functions as an immune checkpoint and is encoded by the C10orf54 gene.

Structure and function 

VISTA is approximately 50kDa and belongs to the immunoglobulin superfamily and has one IgV domain.

VISTA is part of the B7 family, is primarily expressed in white blood cells and its transcription is partially controlled by p53. There is evidence that VISTA can act as both a ligand and a receptor on T cells to inhibit T cell effector function and maintain peripheral tolerance.

Clinical significance 

VISTA is produced at high levels in tumor-infiltrating lymphocytes, such as myeloid-derived suppressor cells and regulatory T cells, and its blockade with an antibody results in delayed tumor growth in mouse models of melanoma and squamous cell carcinoma.

Monocytes from HIV-infected patients produce higher levels of VISTA compared to uninfected individuals. The increased VISTA levels correlated with an increase in immune activation and a decrease in CD4-positive T cells.

As a drug target
There is an ongoing cancer immunotherapy clinical trial for a monoclonal antibody targeting VISTA in advanced cancer. Preliminary results of the phase I clinical trial show good safety tolerance and anti-cancer activity in patients with advanced tumours. Another ongoing clinical trial involves a small molecule that antagonizes the programmed death-ligands 1 and 2 (PD-L1 and PD-L2), and VISTA pathways in patients with advanced solid tumors or lymphomas.

References

Further reading

External links 
 
 

Immune system